Maximus Tainio (born 24 May 2001) is a Finnish professional footballer who plays as a midfielder for Finnish club AC Oulu. He is the son of former footballer Teemu Tainio.

Club career
Tainio signed to Tottenham on a two-year deal in January 2017. Spurs released the player near the end of July 2020. Tainio joined up with his father at Veikkausliiga club FC Haka. On 29 July 2020, he was sent on a short-term loan to AC Kajaani. He played two games in August 2020 in the Ykkönen, the second level of Finnish football, before returning to Haka the same month.

On 4 January 2022, he joined HIFK on a one-year deal.

International career
Tainio has represented Finland at under-17 level.

Career statistics

Club

Notes

References

2001 births
Living people
Finnish footballers
Finnish expatriate footballers
Finland youth international footballers
Association football midfielders
Amsterdamsche FC players
Helsingin Jalkapalloklubi players
Tottenham Hotspur F.C. players
AC Kajaani players
FC Haka players
HIFK Fotboll players
Kakkonen players
Veikkausliiga players
Finnish expatriate sportspeople in the Netherlands
Expatriate footballers in the Netherlands
Finnish expatriate sportspeople in England
Expatriate footballers in England